Celina Tio is an American chef who won the James Beard Foundation Award for Best Mid-West Chef in 2007, has appeared on several Food Network television series, and owns The Belfry restaurant in Kansas City.

Career 
Celina Tio trained at Drexel University. Her first culinary work was in the kitchen of a Bennigan's Irish pub-themed casual dining restaurant, after convincing the manager to take her on. She then began working at the Ritz-Carlton Philadelphia. By the time she was 23, she was executive chef at the grill room within the hotel. She then moved to Florida, where she opened the Mediterranean restaurant Spoodles, the French restaurant Citricos, and the Northern Italian restaurant Palo for Walt Disney World. She then moved to Missouri, to work as executive chef at the American Restaurant in Kansas City. While there, she was named Best Chef by Chef magazine in 2005 and won the James Beard Foundation Award for Best Mid-West Chef in 2007.

She subsequently left to open her own restaurant, Julian in Brookside, Kansas City, in 2009. While at Julian, Tio appeared on several television cooking series such as Top Chef Masters, Iron Chef America and The Next Iron Chef. Julian was a change in cuisine for Tio, with a more relaxed menu instead of the fine dining she served while at the American Restaurant. She opened a second restaurant, called Collection, in 2013, and a further restaurant entitled The Belfry, during the following year.

After eight years, Tio decided not to renew the lease for Julian in 2017, saying "I’ve been very fortunate that Julian has been and remains successful and am super grateful for all the continued support of my guests over the years. But I feel like the time is right to move on and give another local restaurateur an opportunity to thrive in Brookside".

Personal life 

Regarding her ethnicity, Tio has described herself as "half-Chinese".

References

External links 

1970s births
Date of birth missing (living people)
American people of Chinese descent
American businesspeople
American television chefs
Drexel University alumni
James Beard Foundation Award winners
Living people
Participants in American reality television series
American women chefs
21st-century American women